Ruby Pawankar has been President of the World Allergy Organization (WAO), 2012 and 2013. She is the first Indian and first woman President of WAO, which was established in 1951. Currently she is Past President, WAO, President of the Asia Pacific Association of Allergy Asthma and Clinical Immunology (APAAACI) and Council Member of Collegium Internationale Allergolicum (CIA). She is Professor of Allergy, Department of Pediatrics at Nippon Medical School in Tokyo, Japan and Guest Professor at Showa University School of Medicine, Tokyo, Japan, Kyung Hee University School of Medicine, Seoul, Korea and St. John's Medical College, Bengaluru, India. She is a recipient of Pravasi Bharatiya Samman 2010 for excellence in medicine, from the President of India.

Biography 
She was born in Kolkata, West Bengal to T.K. Mathew, Kunnukuzhiyil, Puthuppally in Kottayam District of Kerala, India.  She studied in Loreto, Kolkata and did her Undergraduate Medical Education from the Armed Forces Medical College, Pune India and her post graduation from B.J. Medical College, Pune, Maharashtra, India. She then underwent training in allergy and clinical immunology from Nippon Medical School and Juntendo University School of Medicine, Tokyo Japan. She received her doctorate in allergy and clinical immunology from Nippon Medical School.

Career 
Ruby Pawankar serves on numerous committees and boards of many academic organizations and grant reviews, is a Member/Fellow of several academic organizations including the Collegium International Allergolicum, the American Academy of Allergy, Asthma and Immunology, the American College of Allergy and Immunology the European Academy of Allergy and Clinical Immunology and the Japanese Society of Allergology etc. She is currently also the President of the Indian Academy of Allergy and Advisor to the International Committee of the Japanese Society of Allergology. She is a member of the ELN Network, Inflame, the World Universities Network, GARD, Board member of Interasma.

Besides her clinical and teaching assignments in allergy, her research has focused on the cellular and molecular mechanisms of allergy, impact of environmental pollutants, and novel therapies for allergies. Among her key contributions is the role of gamma delta T cells in allergy and that of mast cells with increased Fcepsilon receptor expression as a major source of the obligatory pro- allergic Th2 cytokines capable of driving local allergen-specific IgE synthesis. This has formed the basis of the successful therapies targeting these cytokines with biological therapeutics today. Her research and educational activities have been strongly translational as it applies to clinical science. She has worked on the role of environmental factors including particulate matter and mite allergens on respiratory allergies and the role of epithelial cells in regulating immune inflammation in allergic airway disease This has resulted in 498 publications with a h-index of 64. She is an Editor of several peer-reviewed journals and books including ‘Allergy Frontiers’, the WAO White Book on Allergy, Update on Respiratory Disorders.

Ruby Pawankar has presided as President/Congress Chair several international congresses including the International Symposium in Allergy and Asthma (ISBAAR) in Tokyo, Japan in 2001, the 10th Trans Pacific Allergy Congress in 2004, in Mumbai, India, the 9th Asian Rhinology Symposium, the Middle East Allergy Asthma Immunology Congress in 2009, 2011, 2015, the WAO International Scientific Conference (WISC) 2012, in Hyderabad, India and the World Allergy Asthma Congress 2013 (WAAC 2013), Milan, Italy.

Published articles include "Asthma insights and reality in the United Arab Emirates" through NCBI.

Recognition 
Dr. Pawankar has focused on the furtherance of India-Japan medical collaboration for a number of years. She is recognised in Japan and worldwide for her outstanding contributions to science in the field of allergy asthma and clinical immunology. Other academic awards include the International Distinguished Fellow Award of ACAAI, the Life Time Achievement Award in Allergy, DN Shivpuri Oration, the SK Malik Oration, Global Accelator Award and the World Achievement Award.

References 

Living people
Year of birth missing (living people)
Indian women medical doctors
20th-century Indian women scientists
Medical doctors from Kerala
People from Kottayam district
20th-century Indian medical doctors
Women scientists from Kerala
20th-century women physicians
Recipients of Pravasi Bharatiya Samman